Öndör or Ondor ("high, tall") may refer to:

 Bor-Öndör, a city in Khentii Province in eastern Mongolia
 Bayan-Öndör (disambiguation), several districts in Mongolia
 Khutag-Öndör, district of Bulgan Province in northern Mongolia
 Öndör Gongor (1880/85–late 1920s), Mongolian who suffered from gigantism